The Ronin Institute for Independent Scholarship, commonly called just the Ronin Institute, is an independent scholarly research institute located in Montclair, New Jersey, United States. The institute is dedicated to multidisciplinary study of science and the humanities and supports the work of independent scientists and scholars.

The institute consists of research scholars from a range of fields and disciplines, such as computational economics, high energy physics, earth sciences, theology, law, history and philosophy. The majority are independent, while others hold faculty appointments at traditional universities. The institute meets regularly for seminars, conferences, and grants management.

History

In 2012, Jon F. Wilkins, an evolutionary biologist, and former member of the Harvard Society of Fellows and Santa Fe Institute, founded the Ronin Institute in New Jersey. The institute's original mission was to aggregate "fractional scholarship" happening outside the academy by creating a new model to support independent researchers.

According to its official mission, the institute remains "devoted to facilitating and promoting scholarly research outside traditional academic research institutions" and providing an alternative to the traditional academic career path and tenure track appointments.

The name "Ronin" derives from the legend of Rōnin: samurais who broke with the code of feudal Japan by refusing to commit suicide upon the deaths of their masters. According to Wilkins, the metaphor is analogous to scholars who leave the academy, but continue to pursue scholarly research:

Organization

The institute is governed by a board of directors with grants and financial administration and a community-level advisory board. Each member of the advisory board leads a working group that focuses on one essential aspect of the community: governance, communications, events, infrastructure, membership, and research.

The institute has a single academic rank, the "Research Scholar", to create a more egalitarian structure. Research Scholars meet virtually and in-person, with researchers from 33 countries.

Notable scholars

Lee Altenberg, evolutionary theory
Laurel Haak, research policy
Arkadiusz Jadczyk, quantum theory
Diane Kelly (scientist), neuroscience
Kristina Killgrove, biological anthropology
Marios Kyriazis, biology and aging
Jocelyn Scheirer, technology
Anders Söderholm, organization theory

References

External links

Research institutes in New Jersey
2012 establishments in New Jersey
Montclair, New Jersey
Research institutes established in 2012